David Indermaur is an Australian clinical psychologist, criminologist, writer, and academic. He is a research associate professor at the University of Western Australia's Crime Research Centre.

Education and career 
Indermaur graduated from the University of Western Australia, obtaining a masters in clinical psychology in 1979 and a Doctor of Law in 1997. In 1976 he worked as a psychologist for prisoners in Western Australia, researching public views on punishment for crimes and court sentencing. In the 1980s and 1990s Indermaur worked on criminal investigations involving drugs and violent crime. His research involves the decision making processes of violent crime offenders in Australia. Later in the 1990s, Indermaur researched crime prevention, domestic violence, and road rage. From 1989 until 1993 he was a lecturer at Edith Cowan University. He has also researched how the fear of crime negatively impacts communities and quality of life.

On 20 April 2010 Indermaur was a speaker at the Rally For Your Rights event, organized by Search For Your Rights, where he criticized stop and search laws.

Personal life 
Indermaur is a member of the In der Maur family. He lives in Nedlands, Western Australia.

Bibliography 
 Are we becoming more violent? A comparison of trends in violent and property offenses in Australia and Western Australia (1995)
 Violent Crime in Australia: Patterns and Politics (2000)
 Penal Populism and Public Opinion (2003)
 Confidence in the Criminal Justice System, Trends and Issues in Crime and Criminal Justice (2009)
 The Ethics of Research with Prisoners (2018)

References 

Living people
20th-century psychologists
21st-century psychologists
Australian criminologists
Australian people of Swiss descent
Australian psychologists
Clinical psychologists
Criminal psychologists
David
Psychology educators
Psychology writers
Academic staff of Edith Cowan University
University of Western Australia alumni
Academic staff of the University of Western Australia
Year of birth missing (living people)